Midgårdsvallen  is a Football and Track & Field stadium in Märsta, Sweden  and the home stadium for the football team Valsta Syrianska IK. The stadium was opened in 2005. The natural grass pitch measures 105 x 65 meters. Currently the Midgårdsvallen stadium is approved for Superettan, but additional flood lights can be installed for Allsvenskan level. The all-weather tracks has IAAF approved surfaces. Midgårdsvallen has a total capacity of 2,400 spectators. The main stand is covered and seats 400.

The complex also includes a heated artificial turf football pitch and another artificial turf pitch for American Football.

References 

Football venues in Sweden
American football venues in Sweden